is the nineteenth single of J-pop girl group Morning Musume. It was released July 30, 2003 and sold a total of 151,104 copies. It peaked at number two on the Oricon Charts.

Overview
This single marks the debut of the "sixth generation" members Miki Fujimoto (who came from a Hello! Project solo career), Sayumi Michishige, Eri Kamei and Reina Tanaka. Once the sixth generation joined, it made it the group's biggest formation yet, with 15 members. Like "Do It! Now" and "As for One Day", "Shabondama" was used as an image song for Quidam, a Cirque du Soleil show. It was released in two editions, a regular and a limited edition coming with fifteen photocards and comes in special packaging.

Track  listing
All lyrics are composed by Tsunku.

CD 
  – 4:06
  – 4:03
 "Shabondama" (instrumental) – 4:06

Single V DVD 
 "Shabondama"
 "Shabondama (Utae! Shabondama Version)"

Personnel
 Yuichi Takahashi - arrangement on "Shabondama"
 Shunsuke Suzuki - arrangement on "Namida ni wa Shitakunai"

Members at time of the release
1st generation: Kaori Iida, Natsumi Abe
2nd generation: Mari Yaguchi
4th generation: Rika Ishikawa, Hitomi Yoshizawa, Nozomi Tsuji, Ai Kago
5th generation: Ai Takahashi, Asami Konno, Makoto Ogawa, Risa Niigaki
6th generation : Miki Fujimoto, Eri Kamei, Sayumi Michishige, Reina Tanaka

SHABONdama Vocalists

Main Vocal: Rika Ishikawa, Ai Kago, Ai Takahashi, Reina Tanaka

Center Vocal: Kaori Iida, Mari Yaguchi, Hitomi Yoshizawa, Risa Niigaki, Nozomi Tsuji, Miki Fujimoto

Minor Vocal: Abe Natsumi,  Asami Konno, Makoto Ogawa, Eri Kamei, Sayumi Michishige

References

External links
Shabondama at Up-Front Works

2003 singles
Morning Musume songs
Zetima Records singles
Song recordings produced by Tsunku
Songs written by Tsunku
Torch songs
2003 songs